WRLF (94.3 FM, "94 Rock") is a mainstream rock formatted broadcast radio station licensed to Fairmont, West Virginia, serving the North-Central West Virginia area. WRLF is owned and operated by Laurel Highland Total Communications, Inc., through licensee LHTC Media of West Virginia, Inc.

History
On August 17, 2020, WRLF changed their format from mainstream rock to a simulcast of sports-formatted WMMN 920 AM Fairmont, branded as "The Ticket".

In late June 2021, WRLF changed their format from a simulcast of sports-formatted WMMN 920 AM back to mainstream rock, branded as "94 Rock".

References

External links
94 Rock Online

RLF
Mainstream rock radio stations in the United States